These are the list of personnel changes in the NBA from the 1968–69 NBA season.

Events

July 9, 1968
 The Philadelphia 76ers traded Wilt Chamberlain to the Los Angeles Lakers for Jerry Chambers, Archie Clark and Darrall Imhoff.

August 27, 1968
 The Phoenix Suns traded Em Bryant to the Boston Celtics for a 1969 2nd round draft pick (Gene Williams was later selected).

September 9, 1968
 The Chicago Bulls sold Ken Wilburn to the Chicago Bulls.

September 11, 1968
 The Phoenix Suns traded Dennis Hamilton to the Atlanta Hawks for a 1969 3rd round draft pick (Lloyd Kerr was later selected).

September 12, 1968
 The Phoenix Suns traded Dick Cunningham to the Milwaukee Bucks for John Arthurs, cash and a future 2nd round draft pick.

September 23, 1968
 The Chicago Bulls traded Keith Erickson to the Los Angeles Lakers for Erwin Mueller.

September 30, 1968
 The Boston Celtics claimed Bud Olsen on waivers from the Milwaukee Bucks.

October 3, 1968
 The Detroit Pistons waived Bob Hogsett.

October 8, 1968
 The Milwaukee Bucks traded Johnny Egan to the Los Angeles Lakers for a future draft pick.

October 12, 1968
 The Seattle SuperSonics traded Walt Hazzard to the Atlanta Hawks for Lenny Wilkens.
 The Detroit Pistons signed Paul Long as a free agent.

October 17, 1968
 The Los Angeles Lakers waived Ed Biedenbach.

October 18, 1968
 The Phoenix Suns signed Ed Biedenbach as a free agent.

November 1, 1968
 The Chicago Bulls signed Ken Wilburn as a free agent.

November 6, 1968
 The Phoenix Suns waived Rod Knowles.

November 8, 1968
 The Chicago Bulls waived Ken Wilburn.
 The Phoenix Suns claimed Bob Warlick on waivers from the Milwaukee Bucks.

November 15, 1968
 The Seattle SuperSonics traded Richie Guerin to the Atlanta Hawks for Dick Smith.

November 21, 1968
 The Phoenix Suns waived Ed Biedenbach.

November 23, 1968
 The Milwaukee Bucks traded Bob Love and Bob Weiss to the Chicago Bulls for Flynn Robinson.

December 1, 1968
 The Chicago Bulls sold Jim Barnes to the Boston Celtics.

December 2, 1968
 The Detroit Pistons fired Donnie Butcher as head coach.
 The Detroit Pistons hired Paul Seymour as head coach.

December 6, 1968
 The Detroit Pistons claimed Bud Olsen on waivers from the Boston Celtics.

December 17, 1968
 The Detroit Pistons traded Jim Fox and a 1969 3rd round draft pick (Lamar Green was later selected) to the Phoenix Suns for McCoy McLemore.

December 19, 1968
 The New York Knicks traded Walt Bellamy and Howard Komives to the Detroit Pistons for Dave DeBusschere.

January 1, 1969
 The Detroit Pistons traded Rich Niemann and cash to the Milwaukee Bucks for Dave Gambee.

January 20, 1969
 The Philadelphia 76ers traded Jerry Chambers to the Phoenix Suns for George Wilson.

January 31, 1969
 The Baltimore Bullets signed John Barnhill as a free agent.
 The Milwaukee Bucks traded Fred Hetzel to the Cincinnati Royals for Zaid Abdul-Aziz and cash.
 The Chicago Bulls traded Erwin Mueller to the Seattle SuperSonics for a 1970 4th round draft pick (John Davis was later selected).

February 1, 1969
 The Cincinnati Royals traded John Tresvant to the Seattle SuperSonics for Al Tucker.

May 8, 1969
 The Phoenix Suns traded Gary Gregor to the Atlanta Hawks for Paul Silas.

May 9, 1969
 The Cincinnati Royals fired Ed Jucker as head coach.
 The Cincinnati Royals hired Bob Cousy as head coach.

May 19, 1969
 Butch Van Breda Kolff resigns as head coach for Los Angeles Lakers.

May 21, 1969
 The Detroit Pistons hired Butch Van Breda Kolff as head coach.

June 20, 1969
 The Phoenix Suns signed Connie Hawkins as a free agent.

June 30, 1969
 Player/Head Coach Bill Russell retired from the Boston Celtics.
 The Los Angeles Lakers hired Joe Mullaney as head coach.

References
NBA Transactions at NBA.com
1968-69 NBA Transactions| Basketball-Reference.com

Transactions
NBA transactions